Religious, Moral and Philosophical Studies (RMPS) is a national qualification subject offered by the Scottish Qualifications Authority. RMPS is offered at different levels and the course varies at each level.

Higher 
Higher RMPS, like all Higher Still courses has 3 units. The first is world Religion; where candidates have the choice of studying one of 6 religions (Buddhism, Christianity, Hinduism, Islam, Judaism and Sikhism). The second is Morality; which deals with sources of moral guidance (such as Kantian ethics, reason and faith, virtue ethics etc.) in addition to one of Gender, Crime and punishment, Medical Ethics or War and Peace.) The third unit is Christianity: Belief and science; which explored the different views science had for creation and origins of the universe ( such as the anthropic principle, teleological argument etc.). Each unit is worth 40 marks in the exam (in the first unit morality is worth 10 and the other choice is worth 30).

In 2011 the results of a three-year study were released, in which it was reported that despite many shortcomings in the way RMPS had been taught in Scotland, the subject was seeing "unprecedented interest and optimism"; the number of students sitting for the  Higher RMPS increased from 1,323 in 2006 to about 4,100 in 2011.

References

External links
Religious, Moral and Philosophical Studies, 2nd ed. (October 2010), Scottish Qualifications Authority

Educational qualifications in Scotland
School examinations